Vulturnus may refer to:
Vulturnus (leafhopper), a genus of leafhoppers in the family Cicadellidae
Vulturnus (wind), the east wind in Roman mythology
Volturno, Latin name for this river of southern Italy
Vespadelus vulturnus, an Australian species of bat